Mandsaur Assembly constituency is one of the Vidhan Sabha (Legislative Assembly) constituencies of Madhya Pradesh state in central India, in Mandsaur District. It is one of the 8 assembly segments of Mandsaur (Lok Sabha constituency). Former CM Sunder Lal Patwa had represented Mandsour Vidhan Sabha seat in the past. Jawad seat, a borough of another former CM Sakhlecha, is also part of this region.

Members of Vidhan Sabha
 1962 : Shyam Sunder Patidar (INC) 
 1967 : T. Mohan Singh (Bharatiya Jana Sangh) 
 1972 : Shyam Sunder Patidar (INC) 
 1977 : Sunderlal Patwa (Janata Party) 
 1980 : Shyam Sunder Patidar (INC-Indira) 
 1985 : Shyam Sunder Patidar (INC) 
 2008 : Yashpal Singh Sisodiya (BJP) 
 2013 : Yashpal Singh Sisodiya (BJP) 
 2018 : Yashpal Singh Sisodiya (BJP)

Election results

1967 Vidhan Sabha
 T. Mohan Singh (BJS) : 17,171 votes 
 S. Patidar (INC) : 11,083

1972 Vidhan Sabha
 Shyam Sunder Patidar (INC) : 27,779 votes 
 Kishore Singh (Jana Sangh) : 19,262

1977 Vidhan Sabha
 Sunderlal Patwa (JNP) : 29,271 votes 
 Dhansukhlal Nandlal Bhachawat (INC) : 20,088

1985 Vidhan Sabha
 Shyam Sundar Patidar (INC) : 29,717 votes
 Manoharlal Basantilal Jain (BJP) : 23,926

2008 Vidhan Sabha
 Yashpal Singh Sisodiya (BJP) : 60,013 votes 
 Mahendra Singh Gurjar (INC) : 58,328

References

Assembly constituencies of Madhya Pradesh